The 2013 Portland State Vikings football team represented Portland State University in the 2013 NCAA Division I FCS football season. They were led by fourth year head coach Nigel Burton and played their home games at Jeld-Wen Field. They were a member of the Big Sky Conference. They finished the season 6–6, 3–5 in Big Sky play to finish in ninth place.

Schedule

Despite also being a member of the Big Sky Conference, the game with UC Davis on September 21 is considered a non conference game and will have no effect on the Big Sky Standings.

Game summaries

Eastern Oregon

@ California

Humboldt State

@ UC Davis

Cal Poly

@ Montana

@ Southern Utah

North Dakota

Weber State

@ Idaho State

Sacramento State

@ Eastern Washington

References

Portland State
Portland State Vikings football seasons
Portland State Vikings football
Portland State Vikings football